The Princesa Tower is a proposed  tall observation tower planned to be built in Puerto Princesa, Palawan, Philippines.

Development
Plans to construct the Princesa Tower was first publicized in September 2018 as a project of the Puerto Princesa city government led by Mayor Lucilo Bayron who wanted a landmark for the city which would be known internationally. If built the tower would be among the tallest structures in the world. Bayron said that the tower will be built at no cost to the Puerto Princesa government except for the  spent for the creation of the architectural design for the tower. Funds are meant to be derived from crowdsourcing. He has also pointed out that Puerto Princesa is a suitable place for such tall structure since the city is not in an earthquake prone part of the Philippines. Despite skepticism for the feasibility of the tower project, Bayron maintained that in 2019 that he is still pushing for the Princesa Tower's construction saying he had received pledges from 12 companies, both foreign and local, worth  for the tower project.

There were separate plan to build a  DNA-like structure which both had retail and observation tower function.

Facilities
It is also planned to host restaurant, a leisure area suitable for activities such as zumba, and a glass floor area.

The tower is planned to be built at the Santa Lucia Environmental Estate and was also considered to built in front of Puerto Princesa's New Green City Hall.

References

Observation towers in the Philippines
Proposed buildings and structures in the Philippines